Chilo zoriandellus is a moth in the family Crambidae. It was described by Stanisław Błeszyński in 1970. It is found in Kenya.

References

Chiloini
Moths described in 1970